B. J. Daniels may refer to:

B. J. Daniels (writer), American writer
B. J. Daniels (American football) (born 1989), American football player

See also
Daniels (surname)